Ottley Russell Coulter (June 6, 1890 - December 17, 1976) was an American strongman, circus performer, weightlifter and police officer. He was a co-founder of the American Continental Weightlifting Association, and the author of a book about strength athletics.

Early life
Coulter was born on June 6, 1890 in Parkman, Ohio. He attended Hiram College for two years and dropped out.

Career
Coulter began his career as a circus performer from 1912 to 1916, including for the Ringling Bros. and Barnum & Bailey Circus. He also worked for US Steel. In the late 1910s, he became a municipal police officer in Lemont Furnace, Pennsylvania. To discourage the use of firearms, Coulter taught hand-to-hand combat in the police department.

An early bodybuilder, Coulter was also a wrestler and powerlifter. In the 1920s, he co-founded the American Continental Weightlifting Association with George F. Jowett and David P. Willoughby. He was an early proponent of tracking progress in the performance of weight-lifters. Coulter wrote articles in Strength, a magazine published by Alan Calvert, in the 1920s. In 1952, he authored of a book about strength athletics.

Personal life and death

Coulter collected books and magazines related to physical culture. His collection is stored at the H.J. Lutcher Stark Center for Physical Culture and Sports.

With his Scottish-born wife nee Ethel Alexander, Coulter had three children. They resided in Lemont Furnace. His wife predeceased him in 1972.

Coulter died on December 17, 1976 in Lemont Furnace, at age 86. He was buried in the Sylvan Heights Cemetery.

Selected works

References

1890 births
1976 deaths
People from Geauga County, Ohio
People from Fayette County, Pennsylvania
Hiram College alumni
American circus performers
American strength athletes
American male weightlifters
American municipal police officers
People associated with physical culture
Strength training writers
19th-century American people
20th-century American people